First National may refer to:

First National Financial Corporation, a Canadian company
First National Pictures, an early Hollywood films studio, later absorbed by Warner Bros
First National (TV series), a 1994–2001 Canadian television newscast

See also
First National Bank (disambiguation)